David Stoll may refer to:

 David Stoll (anthropologist) (born 1952), American cultural anthropologist
 David Stoll (composer) (born 1948), English composer and educator